Paul Cormier (born June 3, 1951) is currently the Chief of Staff for UMass men's basketball. He is the former head men's basketball coach at Dartmouth College.  Recently, Cormier was an advance pro scout for the Golden State Warriors during the 2009–10 season and New Jersey Nets during the 2007–08 and 2008–09 NBA seasons.  Previously, he was an assistant coach for the Memphis Grizzlies during the 2006–07 NBA season. He spent three seasons as an assistant coach for the Boston Celtics (2002–06) following two seasons as the head scout for Boston.  Prior to joining the Celtics, Cormier spent the 1998–99 season as video scout for the New York Knicks.

Cormier coached at the collegiate level for twenty years.  He served seven seasons (1991–98) as head coach of Fairfield University. During the 1995–96 season, Cormier coached Fairfield to a 20–10 overall record, an appearance in the Metro Atlantic Athletic Conference (MAAC) championship game and the program's fourth berth in the NIT.  His MAAC  coaching peers recognized him as the 1995–96 MAAC Coach of the Year.  And during the 1996–97 season, Cormier coached Fairfield to the MAAC Championship and an automatic berth in the NCAA tournament. He then coached the #16 seed Fairfield to an early second half lead and near historic upset of the Dean Smith coached #1 seed North Carolina.  The eight-point loss, 82–74, still stands as the last single-digit loss by a #16 seed to a #1 seed in the NCAA tournament.

Cormier also served seven seasons (1984–91) as head coach at Dartmouth College and an additional six seasons (2010–2016); as an assistant coach at Villanova University (1980–84) and at Bentley College (1978–80).

Cormier is a graduate of the University of New Hampshire. He and his wife, Susan, have four sons.

Head coaching record

References

External links
 NBA: Paul Cormier
 Coaching History at Sports-Reference.com

1951 births
Living people
American men's basketball coaches
American men's basketball players
Basketball coaches from Massachusetts
Basketball players from Massachusetts
Bentley Falcons men's basketball coaches
Boston Celtics assistant coaches
College men's basketball head coaches in the United States
Dartmouth Big Green men's basketball coaches
Fairfield Stags men's basketball coaches
Memphis Grizzlies assistant coaches
New Hampshire Wildcats men's basketball players
People from Lexington, Massachusetts
Sportspeople from Middlesex County, Massachusetts
Villanova Wildcats men's basketball coaches